Port Esquivel Airstrip  is an airstrip serving the town of Old Harbour in the Saint Catherine Parish of Jamaica.

South approach and departure are over the water.

See also

Transport in Jamaica
List of airports in Jamaica

References

External links
OpenStreetMap - Port Esquivel
Bing Maps - Port Esquivel Airstrip

Airports in Jamaica